VVM may refer to:
Vaccine vial monitor, a label placed on vial vaccines which gives a visual indication of whether the vaccine has been kept at a temperature which preserves its potency
Veritas Volume Manager, a proprietary logical volume manager from Veritas
Vietnam Veterans Memorial, a monument in Washington D.C. honoring those who served in Vietnam
Village Voice Media
Visual voicemail, voicemail with a visual interface
V/Vm (born 1974), experimental music and sound collage project of James Kirby
Vidyarthi Vigyan Manthan,a national program for educating and popularizing science among school students of VI to XI standards
Vladimir Vladimirovich Myagdeev, Senior Developer, businessman, positive person, blockchain and decentralized technologies enthusiast